Megalophanes viciella is a moth of the Psychidae family. It is found in most of Europe, except most of northern Europe, the Mediterranean and  Great Britain. It is also found across the Palearctic to Japan.

There is strong sexual dimorphism in the adults. Males have a wingspan of 18–22 mm,  females reach a length of 9–11 mm and are wingless. Adults are on wing from June to July.

The larvae feed on various plants, including Vicia, Rumex, Scirpus, Calluna vulgaris, Betula pubescens, Stachys palustris and Vaccinium uliginosum.

External links
lepiforum.de
schmetterlinge-deutschlands.de 
Fauna Europaea

Psychidae
Moths of Europe
Moths of Asia
Moths described in 1775